The 8th IBF World Championships (World Badminton Championships) were held in Birmingham, England in 1993. Following the results of the men's singles.

Main stage

Section 1

Section 2

Section 3

Section 4

Section 5

Section 6

Section 7

Section 8

Final stage

External links
BWF Results

1993 IBF World Championships